Remembrance Park is a park on the Ohio State University campus in Columbus, Ohio, United States. The public memorial commemorates veteran alumni. The park was officially dedicated in 2011.

See also

 List of parks in Columbus, Ohio

References

External links
 
 

Ohio State University
Parks in Columbus, Ohio